2016 ENEOS 1006 kilometru lenktynes (ENEOS 1006 km race) will be a 17th running of ENEOS 1000 kilometrų lenktynės, a touring car and GT endurance racing event held in Lithuania, at Palanga circuit, 2 kilometers away from resort town Palanga on July 21–23, 2016.

Background

On June 6, 2016, it was announced that race distance will be increased from 1000 kilometers to 1006 kilometers to honor new event promoter TV6. This marked a renewed partnership between race organisers and UAB TELE-3, a Lithuanian television company that owns both TV6 and TV3 brands in Lithuania. TV3 was a race promoter from 2005 to 2008 and the race was then known as 1003 kilometers race.

42 teams entered the race. Multiple and defending race winner Jonas Gelžinis joined Benediktas Vanagas and Sebastiaan Bleekemolen in General Financing by Pitlane team, while his brother and 2015 event winner Ignas Gelžinis moved to newly formed Team Hot Wheels. Another last year's race winner Tautvydas Barštys did not return to defend the title.

Lithuanian racing legend Stasys Brundza crashed his Marcos Mantis during first practice session and was forced to replace his car to BMW M3. However, it failed technical commission.

Qualifying

Qualifying took place on July 22. Ramūnas Čapkauskas took pole position for Carre & MVP by Algirdai team, with best effort of 1:09.724. It was his third pole position with Aquila CR1 prototype. Čapkauskas previously took pole positions in 2012 and 2013 edition of 1000 kilometrų lenktynės. Marius Staboševičius, representing Brum Brum Sport, was second with BMW M3. Jonas Gelžinis took third, driving for General Financing by Pitlane team. Robertas Kupčikas was fastest in diesel powered car class and took eight on the grid with a lap time of 1:14.606.

Qualification: Top 10 shootout results

Race
Race will be held on July 22, 2016.

References

ENEOS 1006 kilometru lenktynes
ENEOS 1006 kilometru lenktynes